Diane Fleri (born 13 July 1983), is a French-born Italian actress.

Early life 
Fleri was born in Quimper, Brittany, France, to an Italian father, Marino Fleri, a diplomat of Estonian and Maltese origins, and a French mother of Vietnamese origin.  She subsequently lived for eight years in Jerusalem, Israel, until the outbreak of the Gulf War; At the age of 9 Fleri moved to Rome. She has two brothers and a sister.

Career 
Fleri's career began by chance when, still a teenager, she accompanied a friend to an audition for the film Come te nessuno mai by Gabriele Muccino; she was eventually chosen by the director for the role of Arianna. After her film debut, Fleri continued her studies, enrolling in the department of political science, and in the meantime she went to live for a year in Paris, where she studied acting and debuted on stage.

After having appeared in several television dramas and short films, she had her breakout role in 2007, playing Francesca in Daniele Luchetti's My Brother Is an Only Child.

Selected filmography 

 But Forever in My Mind (1999)
 Achille e la tartaruga (2005) 
 My Brother Is an Only Child (2007) 
 Solo un padre (2008) 
 Il prossimo tuo (2008) 
 I Am Love (2009) 
 Hayfever (2010)
 L'amore fa male (2011)
 It May Be Love But It Doesn't Show (2011)
 A Flat for Three (2012)
 Nina (2012)

References

External links 
 

Italian film actresses
Italian television actresses
1983 births
People from Quimper
Living people
French expatriate actors
French film actresses
French television actresses
French stage actresses
French people of Italian descent
French people of Estonian descent
French people of Vietnamese descent